Muhammad Alif Haikal bin Mohd Sabri (born 19 October 1995) is a Malaysian footballer who plays for PKNS as a midfielder.

Career statistics

Club

References

External links
 

Malaysian footballers
Malaysia Super League players
PKNS F.C. players
Living people
1995 births

Association football midfielders